The politics of Somalia takes place in a framework of federal parliamentary republic. According to the Constitution of Somalia, the President of Somalia is head of state, and Prime Minister as head of government who is appointed by the President with the parliament's approval. The country has a bicameral legislature, which consists of the Senate (upper house) and the National Assembly of Somalia (lower house). Together, they make up the Federal Parliament of Somalia. In 2012, the Federal Parliament of Somalia was concurrently inaugurated, ushering in the Federal Government of Somalia, the first permanent central government in the country since the start of the civil war. With a new constitution and a new parliament representing diverse parties and factions, Somalia's political structure subsequently showed signs of stabilization.

Federal Parliament of Somalia

Legislative branch

The Federal Parliament of Somalia is the national parliament of Somalia. Formed in August 2012, it is based in the capital Mogadishu and is bicameral, consisting of an upper house which represents federal states and a lower house. The Federal Parliament of Somalia elects the President and has the authority to pass and veto laws, and consists of a 275-seat lower house as well as an upper house capped at 54 representatives.

Judiciary

The Constitution states that the judiciary is independent of the legislative and executive branches of government whilst fulfilling its judicial functions. Members of the judiciary shall be subject only to the law. The Somali judicial system is based on Islamic law, Judicial authority of the Federal Republic is vested in the courts. The judiciary is independent of the legislative and executive branches of government whilst fulfilling its judicial functions. It can declare statutes as null and void if they are in violation of the Federal Constitution.

The national court structure consists of:
The Constitutional Court
The Federal Government level courts
The Federal Member State level courts

A nine-member Judicial Service Commission appoints any Federal tier member of the judiciary. It also selects and presents potential Constitutional Court judges to the House of the People of the Federal Parliament for approval. If endorsed, the President appoints the candidate as a judge of the Constitutional Court. The five-member Constitutional Court adjudicates issues pertaining to the constitution, in addition to various Federal and sub-national matters. The Constitutional Court is composed of 5 judges, The Judicial Service Commission shall nominate as judge of the Constitutional Court only persons of high integrity, with appropriate qualifications in law and Shari’a, and who is highly competent in Constitutional matters, and who are of high moral character. Nominees are then presented to the House of the People of the Federal Parliament for approval. If endorsed, the President appoints the candidate as a judge of the Constitutional Court. The Chief Judge and Deputy Chief Judge are later chosen by the Constitutional Court judges from within their membership ranks.

Administrative divisions

Somalia is officially divided into eighteen regions (plural gobollada; singular gobol), which in turn are subdivided into districts. The regions are:

Political parties and elections

See also

Constitution of Somalia
President of Somalia
List of presidents of Somalia
List of prime ministers of Somalia
List of political parties in Somalia
Federal Parliament of Somalia
Political history of Somalia
History of Somalia
Somaliland

References

External links
Majid, Nisar, Aditya Sarkar, Claire Elder, Khalif Abdirahman, Sarah Detzner, Jared Miller, and Alex De Waal. "Somalia’s politics: the usual business? A synthesis paper of the Conflict Research Programme." (2021). 
BBC Country Profile for Somalia

 
Decentralization